The 1985 Cork Intermediate Football Championship was the 50th staging of the Cork Intermediate Football Championship since its establishment by the Cork County Board in 1909. The draw for the opening round fixtures took place on 27 January 1985. The championship ran from 20 April to 15 September 1985.

The final was played on 15 September 1985 at Páirc Uí Chaoimh in Cork, between O'Donovan Rossa and Glanmire, in what was their first ever meeting in the final. O'Donovan Rossa won the match by 3-11 to 0-08 to claim their second championship title overall and a first title in 61 years.

O'Donovan Rossa's Mick McCarthy was the championship's top scorer with 0-30.

Results

First round

Second round

Quarter-finals

Semi-finals

Final

Championship statistics

Top scorers

Overall

In a single game

Miscellaneous

O'Donovan Rossa win their first Intermediate title since 1924, having lost the last two finals.

References

Cork Intermediate Football Championship